"The Motherload" is a song by American progressive metal band Mastodon. The song was released as the third and final single from the band's sixth studio album, Once More 'Round the Sun.

Music video
The song's music video shows several women twerking in front of a group of men inter-cut with footage of the band performing the song. During the solo, the women start dancing in front of the band. Another woman enters and as she dances, psychedelic images appear, with the others cheering her on. They all begin dancing again as the song ends.

Controversy
The video caused some controversy as it featured many women twerking. Dom Lawson of The Guardian criticized the video, calling it "blatant, idiotic and utterly pointless sexism."

Brann Dailor defended the video, saying it was meant to be a parody of "esoteric", "creepy" '90s rock and metal videos and the videos for Nicki Minaj's "Anaconda", Taylor Swift's "Shake It Off" and Iggy Azalea's "Booty". The video was also meant as an homage to the band's hometown, Atlanta, which was one of the cities pivotal to early hip hop music. One of the dancers in the video, Jade, defended it, saying "it's not a satirical video, but rather one with an inclusive message."

The video received a positive response from publications such as The Huffington Post and The Independent.

Track listing
Digital single

12" single

Chart positions

Personnel
 Troy Sanders – bass, lead vocals (refrain)
 Brent Hinds – lead guitar
 Brann Dailor – drums, lead vocals (verses and chorus)
 Bill Kelliher – rhythm guitar

References

2014 songs
2014 singles
Mastodon (band) songs
Reprise Records singles
Songs about suicide
Song recordings produced by Nick Raskulinecz